Amelia Fiona Jessica "Minnie" Driver (born 31 January 1970) is a British and American actress. She rose to prominence with her break-out role in 1995's Circle of Friends. She went on to star in a wide range of films including the cult classic Grosse Pointe Blank, Gus Van Sant's Good Will Hunting for which she was nominated for both the Academy Award for Best Supporting Actress and a Screen Actors Guild Award, the musical The Phantom of the Opera, Owning Mahowny, and providing the voice of Lady Eboshi in Hayao Miyazaki's Princess Mononoke.

In television, Driver starred with Eddie Izzard in The Riches for which she was nominated for both an Emmy and a Golden Globe. She has starred in the ABC sitcom Speechless, the NBC sitcom About a Boy, and in a recurring role in the NBC series  Will & Grace. She has also starred in several miniseries in the UK including The Deep for BBC One.

Predating her work as an actress, Driver started as a singer and has released three full solo albums over the span of her career. She has also lent her voice to a variety of animated series and films including SuperMansion and Tarzan as well as video games including Jurassic Park: Trespasser.

Early life and education
Amelia Fiona Jessica Driver was born in London and raised in Barbados until she was six. The nickname Minnie was given to her by her older sister Kate in childhood.

Her mother, Gaynor Churchward (1937–2021), was a fabric designer and former couture model. Her father, Charles Ronald Driver (1921–2009), was born in Swansea, Wales, and was of English and Scottish descent. He earned the Distinguished Flying Medal for his role in the Battle of Heligoland Bight and was a director of London United Investments.

Her parents never married as her father was married to another woman throughout his relationship with Minnie's mother. Her parents broke off their relationship when Minnie was six years old. She was sent to Bedales School in Hampshire as a boarder soon after. She later attended the Webber Douglas Academy of Dramatic Art, and Collingham College, an independent college in Kensington, Central London. Minnie's older sister Kate is a film producer and manager. She also has one older half-sister, Susan Driver, from her father's prior marriage, and two younger half-brothers: Charlie Driver, a football agent, from Ronald's subsequent marriage, and Ed Churchward from her mother's subsequent one.

Career

Acting
Driver's television debut was in a 1991 TV advertisement for Right Guard deodorant. Driver also made her stage debut in 1991, supplementing her income by performing as a jazz vocalist and guitarist. In 1993 she featured in an episode of Maigret, alongside Michael Gambon and Michael Sheen. Also in 1993, she played  alongside Jonathan Pryce in the mini-series, Mr Wroe's Virgins. She appeared in The Day Today, on British television, with comedian Steve Coogan and for satirist Armando Iannucci, and had small parts in Casualty, The House of Eliott, Lovejoy and Peak Practice. 

Driver gained broader public attention when she played the lead role in Circle of Friends in 1995, opposite Chris O'Donnell. She followed this with a minor role in GoldenEye (1995), a supporting role in Sleepers (1996), a leading role in Big Night (1996), and as a co-star in Grosse Pointe Blank (1997), opposite John Cusack.

Driver played opposite Matt Damon as Skylar in the drama Good Will Hunting (1997), for which she was nominated for an Academy Award for Best Supporting Actress and a Screen Actors Guild Award. Driver was also considered to play Rose DeWitt Bukater in the 1997 film Titanic, but director James Cameron felt she was too old so Kate Winslet was cast instead.

In 1998, Driver starred in Sandra Goldbacher's film The Governess. That year, she co-starred opposite Christian Slater and Morgan Freeman in the action thriller Hard Rain. Driver has also worked on several animated features, voicing Jane in Disney's 1999 version of Tarzan and Lady Eboshi in the 1999 English-dubbed release of the Japanese film Princess Mononoke. In 2003 and 2004, she had a recurring role on Will & Grace as Lorraine Finster, the nemesis of Karen Walker (Megan Mullally) and daughter of Karen's lover, Lyle Finster (John Cleese).

In March 2007, Driver made her return to television in the FX Network show The Riches. She was nominated for an Emmy Award and a Golden Globe Award as Best Lead Actress in a Drama Series in 2007 and 2008, respectively. She was scheduled to appear in The Simpsons Movie, although her appearance was cut from the final version. Driver appeared in the January 2010 episode of Modern Family entitled "Moon Landing". She also starred in the television series The Deep and appeared in Conviction, in the comedy drama Barney's Version, winning a Genie Award for Best Supporting Actress.

In October 2013, Driver started filming for The Crash which was released on 13 January 2017.

Driver landed the lead role in the ABC sitcom Speechless, playing the mother of three children, one of whom has cerebral palsy and uses a wheelchair. The series debuted in the 2016–17 TV season. It was cancelled in May 2019 after three seasons.

Music

Driver began making music at boarding school. She collaborated on Bomb the Bass's album Clear, in 1994, as part of the outfit River.  She was part of the Milo Roth Band, which received a recording contract when she was 19. In 2001 she signed with EMI and Rounder Records and performed at the SXSW music festival. The title song of Everything I've Got in My Pocket, her first album, reached No. 34 in the U.K., and the song "Invisible Girl" peaked at No. 68. Driver wrote 10 of the 11 songs on the album. In 2004, Driver was the supporting act for the Finn Brothers on the U.K. portion of their world tour.

In 2004, Driver played Carlotta Giudicelli in Joel Schumacher's film The Phantom of the Opera, based on the musical of the same name by Andrew Lloyd Webber. Driver sang "Learn to be Lonely", an original song written for the film by Lloyd Webber. However, because of her lack of opera experience, all her songs as Carlotta were dubbed by opera singer Margaret Preece. Driver released her second album, Seastories, in July 2007, featuring guest appearances by Ryan Adams, the Cardinals and Liz Phair. Driver released a third album in October 2014 called Ask Me to Dance that includes songs by Elliott Smith, Neil Young and The Killers.

Podcast 
In 2021, Driver started a podcast, Minnie Questions with Minnie Driver, in which she asks guests a series of seven questions, inspired by the Proust Questionnaire. Guests have included Chelsea Clinton, Nick Jonas and Cindy Crawford.

Personal life 
Driver has been in a relationship with Addison O'Dea since 2019. She was briefly engaged to Josh Brolin in 2001. She has a son (born 5 September 2008) from a brief relationship with television writer and producer Timothy J. Lea.

In 2016, Driver revealed that she was sexually assaulted at age 17 while on holiday in Greece.

On 21 December 2017, Driver became an American citizen.

Driver was a long-time ambassador for and supporter of Oxfam until withdrawing her support in 2018 over a sexual abuse scandal in the organisation.

Filmography

Film

Television

Awards and nominations

Other media

Web

Video games

Discography

Albums

Singles

Works

References

External links 

 
 

1970 births
Living people
20th-century English actresses
21st-century American actresses
21st-century American memoirists
21st-century American women writers
21st-century English actresses
21st-century English non-fiction writers
21st-century English women singers
21st-century English singers
21st-century English women writers
21st-century English memoirists
Actresses from London
Actresses from Los Angeles
Alumni of the Webber Douglas Academy of Dramatic Art
American film actresses
American people of Scottish descent
American television actresses
American voice actresses
American women memoirists
American women podcasters
American podcasters
Best Supporting Actress Genie and Canadian Screen Award winners
British expatriate actresses in the United States
British expatriates in Barbados
British women podcasters
English emigrants to the United States
English film actresses
English people of Scottish descent
English podcasters
English television actresses
English video game actresses
English voice actresses
English women non-fiction writers
English women singer-songwriters
People educated at Bedales School
People with acquired American citizenship
Rounder Records artists
Singers from London
Singers from Los Angeles
Writers from London
Writers from Los Angeles
Zoë Records artists